Aquatic Conservation: Marine and Freshwater Ecosystems is a bimonthly peer-reviewed scientific journal published by Wiley-Blackwell.  The journal is dedicated to publishing original papers that relate specifically to freshwater, brackish or marine habitats and encouraging work that spans these ecosystems.  According to the Journal Citation Reports, the journal has a 2014 impact factor of 2.136.

References

External links 
 

Ecology journals
Conservation biology
English-language journals
Publications established in 1991
Wiley-Blackwell academic journals
Bimonthly journals
1991 establishments in the United Kingdom